Anda Uldum or Andreas René Uldum (born 21 April 1979 in Qeqertarsuaq) is a former Greenlandic politician and a former member of the Inatsisartut. He was the leader of the Greenland party Demokraatit. 2015 he became Minister of Finance and Raw Materials when his party the Democrats entered a coalition with the social democratic Siumut and another centre-right party, Atassut. In 2016, he resigned his post and left politics due to health issues. He later moved to Denmark.  

He graduated as a social worker, but is known throughout Greenland for his music career, both in the band  DDR and as a soloist. He has released Kids plate Angakkuakkatut at Atlantic Music.

References  

 Greenland Parliament, www.inatsisartut.gl 
 Atlantic Music, www.atlanticmusicshop.gl

External links
www.DEMOKRAATIT.gl
twitter.com/AndaUldum
facebook.com/anda.uldum

1979 births
Living people
Greenlandic Inuit people
Greenlandic people of Danish descent
Members of the Parliament of Greenland
People from Qeqertarsuaq
Democrats (Greenland) politicians